Bruna Colósio (born 13 October 1980) is a retired Brazilian tennis player.

Colósio has won the Gold medal partnering Joana Cortez at the 2003 Pan American Games, as well as two singles and eleven doubles titles on the ITF circuit in her career. On 21 July 2003, she reached her best singles ranking of world number 291. On 12 January 2004, she peaked at number 193 in the WTA doubles rankings.

Playing for Brazil at the Fed Cup, Bruna has a win–loss record of 7–6.

Tennis career

Junior
Bruna had a successful junior career, peaking at world number 43 in singles and No. 10 in doubles; both on December 31, 1997. She reached a total of eleven finals in doubles; with nine titles. Colósio won her only singles titles in her only final. She played at all the Grand Slam events except the Australian Open in 1997. Colósio ended her junior career with a 34–25 record on singles and 45–15 on doubles.

In 1997, between January and March, Bruna reached eight consecutive doubles finals in eight weeks, winning six titles. Her defeats came through the hands of the year-end number-one pair, Cara Black and Irina Selyutina. During that period, she also won her only singles title, a G3 tournament in Bolivia.

Senior career
Bruna played mostly at the ITF Women's Circuit during her senior career. She played at a WTA Tour tournament main draw once, in doubles, at the WTA Brasil Open in 2002, partnering Vanessa Menga. In 2004, she tried and failed to qualify to both singles and doubles main draw at the Copa Colsanitas. During her early career, she played at the ITA circuit, peaking at No. 5, but couldn't manage to keep the good results to enter the WTA tournaments.

Her career highlights include a gold medal at the Pan American Games in Santo Domingo, partnering Joana Cortez,  two ITF single titles and eleven ITF doubles titles.

Colósio also played in eight ties for the Brazil Fed Cup team, in 2001, 2003–04, with a 7–6 record.

She retired from professional level in 2005.

Career finals

ITF Women's Circuit

Singles (2–3)

Doubles (11–7)

ITF Junior's finals

Singles (1–0)

Doubles (9–2)

References

External links
 
 
 

1980 births
Brazilian female tennis players
Living people
Tennis players at the 2003 Pan American Games
Pan American Games gold medalists for Brazil
Pan American Games medalists in tennis
Medalists at the 2003 Pan American Games
Sportspeople from Paraná (state)
21st-century Brazilian women
20th-century Brazilian women